George Buchanan-Smith (born 20 July 1964) is a former Scotland international rugby union player. He represented Scotland from 1989 to 1990.

Early life
George Buchanan-Smith was born in July 1964 in Edinburgh. He attended Fettes College and later studied at Loughborough University.

Rugby union career

Amateur career

He played for Loughborough Students before playing for London Scottish.

Provincial career

He played for the Scottish Exiles district side as a Flanker.

International career

He was capped by Scotland 'B' to play France 'B' in 1989.

Buchanan-Smith made his international debut on 28 October 1989 at Murrayfield in the Scotland vs Fiji match.
Of the 2 matches he played for his national side he was never on the losing side.  
He played his final match for Scotland on 10 November 1990 at Murrayfield in the Scotland vs Argentina match.

Later life

George Buchanan-Smith went on to become franchisee and operator of three McDonald's restaurants in Dunfermline, Scotland.

References

1964 births
Living people
People educated at Fettes College
Scottish rugby union players
Scotland international rugby union players
Rugby union flankers
Loughborough Students RUFC players
Alumni of Loughborough University
Rugby union players from Edinburgh
Scottish Exiles (rugby union) players
London Scottish F.C. players
Scotland 'B' international rugby union players